Lawrence O'Donnell is the Congressional aide, screenwriter, and television journalist.

Lawrence O'Donnell also may refer to:
 The Last Word with Lawrence O'Donnell, TV program anchored by the above journalist
 Lawrence O'Donnell (general), Australian Army officer
 Lawrence O'Donnell, pseudonymous science-fiction writing duo also known as Lewis Padgett

See also 
 Laurence O'Donnell (died 1855), Roman Catholic Bishop of Galway